Kwangwa (Kwanga) is a Bantu language of Zambia.

Maho (2009) lists K.721 Kwandi as a distinct but closely related language.

Kwandi and Kwanga had once been classified as dialects of the divergent Luyana language.

References

Bantu languages
Languages of Zambia
Kavango languages